Kervin Bristol (born September 4, 1988) is a Haitian-American professional basketball player who last played for the London Lions of the British Basketball League (BBL).

Early years
Bristol was born in Port-au-Prince to Marlene Beaurais and Frank Bristol. In Haiti, he played at the Institution Saint-Louis de Gonzague before deciding to move to the United States, enrolling at Broward College in Fort Lauderdale, Florida.

After redshirting his first year, Bristol earned time as a rotation player for the Seahawks, averaging 10.1 points per game and 9.6 rebounds per game en route to helping Broward to a Southern Conference title. As a sophomore, Broward averaged 12.4 points per game and 10.8 rebounds per game.

As a transfer candidate, Bristol received offers from Southern Miss, Hofstra, Auburn, and Fordham. Bristol ultimately selected to play for the Fordham Rams. Bristol played two years in a reserve role, graduated with a Bachelor's Degree in Finance in 2012, then proceeded to pursue a professional basketball career in Europe.

Professional
Bristol started playing professional basketball for the Istanbulspor of the Turkish Basketball Second League (TB2L). In 19 games he averaged 10.1ppg, 12.2rpg (third in the league) and 1.6bpg in the 2012–13 season.

Bristol then played a season for KD Hopsi Polzela in Slovenia (SKL). In 14 games he averaged 11.4ppg, 10.9rpg (led the league), 1.1apg and 2.4bpg in the 2012–13 season, where he was awarded the MVP.

In the summer of 2013, Bristol tried out for the Huracanes del Atlántico of the Dominican Republic League (LNB), but ultimately did not sign.

Bristol played for the MBC Mykolaiv in Ukraine, where he averaged 12.7ppg, 12.4rpg (led the league) and 2.5bpg in 15 games. He was named All-Ukrainian Superleague Defensive Player of the Year, All-Ukrainian Superleague Import Player of the Year, All-Ukrainian Superleague Forward of the Year.

Bristol has played for the BC Krasnye Krylia in Russia, but was released by the team before the season was over. In 19 games, he recorded 7.4ppg, 9.6rpg (second in the league) and 1.6bpg.

He had short stints with the JDA Dijon Basket of the LNB Pro A (France), and the Nea Kifissia B.C. of Greece (GBL). In the 2015–16 season he played for KK Włocławek of the Polish League (PLK).

On August 21, 2018, Bristol signed with the London Lions of the British league.

On 3 August 2020 the London Lions re-signed Kervin after a season in Ukraine. Kervin was a member of the 2018–19 Lions squad.

Records
VTB United League record: Most rebounds in a game (19)
VTB United League record: Most blocks in a half (5)
VTB United League record: Highest rebound average (9.63)

References

External links
 Kervin Bristol at espn.com
 Kervin Bristol at realgm.com
 Kervin Bristol at eurobasket.com

 Fordham bio

1988 births
Living people
American expatriate basketball people in Finland
American expatriate basketball people in France
American expatriate basketball people in Greece
American expatriate basketball people in Lithuania
American expatriate basketball people in Poland
American expatriate basketball people in Russia
American expatriate basketball people in Slovenia
American expatriate basketball people in Turkey
American expatriate basketball people in Ukraine
American expatriate basketball people in the United Kingdom
American men's basketball players
American sportspeople of Haitian descent
BC Budivelnyk players
BC Krasnye Krylia players
BC Nizhny Novgorod players
BC Odesa players
BC Prienai players
MBC Mykolaiv players
Broward College alumni
Centers (basketball)
Fordham Rams men's basketball players
Haitian men's basketball players
Haitian emigrants to the United States
Basketball players from New York City
JDA Dijon Basket players
Junior college men's basketball players in the United States
Kataja BC players
KK Włocławek players
London Lions (basketball) players
Nea Kifissia B.C. players
Power forwards (basketball)
Sportspeople from Brooklyn
Sportspeople from Port-au-Prince